The 1931 Bristol East by-election was held on 16 January 1931.  The by-election was held due to the death of the incumbent Labour MP, Walter John Baker.  It was won by the Labour candidate Stafford Cripps.

Electoral history

Candidates
The Liberal Party ran 56 year-old Edward Baker. Baker owned an engineering business in East London. He had previously contested Manchester Platting for the Liberal Party at the 1924 general election and Howdenshire for the Liberal Party at the 1929 general election.

Result

Aftermath
Following the formation of the National Government, the Liberals in Bristol East chose not to run a candidate at the 1931 general election. Baker was chosen again to contest Howdenshire but withdrew to support the incumbent National Government candidate. He fought Howdenshire again in 1935 without success.

References

Bristol East by-election
Bristol East by-election
20th century in Bristol
Bristol East by-election
East, 1931